Reinhard Bonnke (19 April 1940 – 7 December 2019) was a German-American Pentecostal evangelist, principally known for his gospel missions throughout Africa. Bonnke had been an evangelist and missionary in Africa since 1967.

Early life 
Reinhard Bonnke was born on 19 April 1940, in Königsberg, East Prussia, Germany, the son of an army logistics officer. With his mother and siblings, he was taken to Denmark during the evacuation of East Prussia and spent some years in a displaced person center.
He became a born-again Christian at the age of nine after his mother spoke with him about a sin that he had committed. He sensed a call from God to serve as a missionary in Africa from the age of 10 and said that he had the experience of baptism in the Holy Spirit. After his own war service, his father had become a pastor.

Bonnke studied at the Bible College of Wales in Swansea, Wales, where he was inspired by the director, Samuel Rees Howells. In one meeting after Howells spoke of answered prayer, Bonnke prayed, "Lord, I also want to be a man of faith. I want to see your way of providing for needs." Passing through London, he had a chance meeting with the famous preacher George Jeffreys, who encouraged the young German student. After graduation, he pastored in Germany for seven years. His African ministry, which he was principally known for, began in 1967 in Lesotho. He subsequently held evangelistic meetings across the continent.

It is estimated that over 79 million people converted to Christianity as a result of Bonnke's ministry. He was called a "giant and a general in the Army of God".

African mission
Early on, Bonnke encountered poor results from his evangelistic efforts and felt frustrated at the pace of his ministry. Bonnke claimed to have had a recurring dream featuring a picture of the map of Africa being spread with red and heard the voice of God crying "Africa Shall Be Saved". This led him to adopt large-scale evangelism, rather than the traditional small-scale missionary approach. He rented a stadium in Gaborone, Botswana, and preached with little cooperation from local churches. Beginning with only 100 people, the stadium meetings grew.

In 1974, Bonnke founded the mission organisation Christ For All Nations (abbreviated CfaN). Originally based in Johannesburg, South Africa, the headquarters were relocated to Frankfurt, Germany, in 1986. This was done primarily to distance the organisation from South Africa's apartheid policy at the time. Today CfaN has 9 offices across 5 continents.

Bonnke began his ministry holding tent meetings that accommodated large crowds. According to an account published by the Christian Broadcasting Network, in 1984 he commissioned the construction of what was claimed to be the world's largest mobile structure – a tent capable of seating 34,000; this was destroyed in a wind storm just before a major meeting and therefore the team decided to hold the event in the open air instead. According to this account, the event was subsequently attended by over 100,000 people which is far greater than the 34,000 seating capacity the tents could contain.

In addition to South Africa, Bonnke would also hold numerous crusades in other African countries such as Nigeria and Kenya and became known as "the Billy Graham of Africa." In the 5 February 2001 edition of Graham's Christianity Today, journalist Corrie Cutrer stated that Bonnke had set "record-breaking attendances" at recent crusades he held in Nigeria. Bonnke announced his "farewell gospel crusade" to be held in Lagos, Nigeria, in November 2017. Lagos is also the location of a gospel crusade held in 2000 which, according to CfaN, is the organization's largest to date, drawing an attendance of six million people. In 2019 Reinhard Bonnke was set to headline the G12 Africa Conference in Pretoria, South Africa.

Controversy
In 1991, during Bonnke's visit to Kano in Nigeria, there were riots in the city as Muslims protested over remarks he had reportedly made about Islam in the city of Kaduna on his way to Kano. A rumour was spread that Bonnke was planning to "lead an invasion" into Kano. Muslim youths gathered at the Kofar Mata Eide-ground where they were addressed by several clerics who claimed that Bonnke was going to blaspheme Islam. About 8,000 youths gathered at the Emir's palace and after noon prayers the riots ensued, during which many Christians sustained various injuries and several churches were burned. At least eight people were killed according to official reports.

Bonnke's subsequent attempts to return to Nigeria were denied, as the Nigerian Embassy refused his visa applications.

After nine years, he returned to Nigeria to preach. A new civilian government in Nigeria had been elected to power, and President Olusegun Obasanjo, a  Christian, invited Reinhard Bonnke to return to the country. Bonnke returned to Nigeria with the Benin City crusade in the Southern Region of Nigeria. He would deny reports that the Northern Region of Nigeria's Council of Ulamas banned him from entering northern Nigera.

Personal life 
After graduating from the Bible College of Wales and returning to Germany, Bonnke led a series of meetings in Rendsburg. He began receiving speaking invitations from all around Germany and the rest of the world. Bonnke met Anni Suelze at a gospel music festival and admired the grace with which she recovered from a wrongly pitched music performance at the expense of losing the competition. He offered to preach at the church she attended one Sunday and fell in love with her. They married in 1964 and had three children.

Death 
Bonnke died on 7 December 2019. Bonnke had announced on his official Facebook page in November 2019 that he had undergone femur surgery and needed time to "learn how to walk again". Nigerian President Muhammadu Buhari, who is Muslim, praised Bonnke for his frequent visits to Nigeria and described Bonnke's death as a "great loss to Nigeria".

Autobiography 
Bonnke's autobiography, Living a Life of Fire, is a collection of stories of his life, including accounts of his childhood growing up during the Second World War and living in prison camps to his early years in ministry and how he believed God used him to bring the gospel of salvation to Africa.

References

External links 

 CfaN Christ for all Nations

1940 births
2019 deaths
German evangelicals
German evangelists
Faith healers
Clergy from Königsberg
German Pentecostals
German expatriates in Wales
German expatriates in South Africa
Pentecostal missionaries
Protestant missionaries in Africa